Alan James McLaren (born 4 January 1971, in Edinburgh) is a Scottish former footballer, who played for Heart of Midlothian and Rangers.

Football career

Club
McLaren started his career with Hearts in 1987 and made over 180 appearances for the Tynecastle club. He moved to Rangers in October 1994 in a £2m part-exchange deal, with Dave McPherson moving the opposite direction. He made his debut against Old Firm rivals Celtic on 30 October 1994 in a 3–1 win at Hampden Park.

He was forced to retire from football in 1998, aged 27, due to injury. His final appearance for Rangers was as captain in a 1–0 win over Dundee United in which Rangers secured their 9th title in row.

On 2 March 1999, Rangers played English club Middlesbrough in a testimonial match for McLaren at Ibrox in front of 49,468 spectators. McLaren scored a penalty in a 4–4 draw.

International
McLaren also won 24 caps for Scotland. He was named in the squad for UEFA Euro 1992, but did not feature in any matches. He was forced to miss UEFA Euro 1996 through injury, being replaced by Derek Whyte in the squad.

Post football career
McLaren became an ambassador for charity Football Aid and a regular pundit on Rangers TV.

References

External links

1971 births
Living people
Heart of Midlothian F.C. players
Footballers from Edinburgh
Rangers F.C. players
Scotland international footballers
Scottish Football League players
Scottish footballers
UEFA Euro 1992 players
Scotland under-21 international footballers
Association football central defenders